Nathan Pedersen (born 1995) is an Australian international lawn bowler.

Bowls career
Pedersen has won four Australian Open titles. The 2015 & 2016 fours, the 2016 pairs and the 2017 singles.

He has twice won the Hong Kong International Bowls Classic pairs title, winning in 2015 and 2016 with Corey Wedlock.

References

1995 births
Living people
Australian male bowls players